"Dieci" is a song by Italian singer Annalisa. It was written by Annalisa, Davide "d.whale" Simonetta, Paolo Antonacci and Dargen D'Amico and produced by Simonetta.

It was released by Warner Music Italy on 3 March 2021 as the first single from the reissue of seventh studio album Nuda10. The song was Annalisa's entry for the Sanremo Music Festival 2021, the 71st edition of Italy's musical festival which doubles also as a selection of the act for Eurovision Song Contest, where it placed 7th in the grand final. "Dieci" peaked at number 7 on the Italian FIMI Singles Chart and was certified platinum in Italy.

Background
The song, written during the 2020 lockdown due to the COVID-19 pandemic, talks about the singer's love for music. During an interview, Annalisa said: "My song is called Dieci and it's a kind of declaration of my love for music.  It's the story of this love that doesn't want to end, so it clings to the last times which are never the last. At the same time there is obviously everything I feel in this moment, the determination, the desire not to give up, to start over and also the desire to share my music with people, which I have been doing for ten years".

Music video
The music video for the song was released on YouTube on 3 March 2021, to accompany the single's release. Directed by Giacomo Triglia, it stars Annalisa and actor Riccardo Mandolini.

Live performances
On 24 April 2021 Annalisa performed the song during the sixth show of the 20th season of Amici di Maria De Filippi.

Track listing

Charts

Certifications

References

2021 singles
2021 songs
Annalisa songs
Sanremo Music Festival songs
Songs written by Davide Simonetta
Songs written by Annalisa